Mélanie Gaubil (born 4 October 1997) is a French archer who competed at the 2014 Summer Youth Olympics.

Career
Gaubil contested the 2013 French National Archery Championships in both the junior and senior categories, finishing as the runner-up in the former and sixth overall in the latter after being eliminated in the quarter-finals. She later achieved a bronze medal in the women's team event at the Mediterranean Games in Mersin, and by the end the year had set five new national records.

Gaubil made her Olympic debut at the 2014 Summer Youth Olympics in Nanjing. She placed fifth in the 72-arrow ranking round, setting a personal record of 663 points from 720 despite suffering from an inflamed shoulder, before progressing through the elimination rounds to the final. She was defeated by China's Li Jiaman in a tie-breaking one-arrow shoot-off, receiving the silver medal as the runner-up. 

Gaubil reached her first senior international final at the opening stage of the 2019 Archery World Cup, where she lost in straight sets to South Korea's Kang Chae-young.

She is coached by Nicholas Rifaut and is a member of Les archers leguevinois, an archery club.

References

External links
 

Living people
1997 births
Place of birth missing (living people)
Archers at the 2014 Summer Youth Olympics
French female archers
Mediterranean Games bronze medalists for France
Mediterranean Games medalists in archery
Competitors at the 2013 Mediterranean Games
21st-century French women